Events in the year 1957 in Brazil.

Incumbents

Federal government
 President: Juscelino Kubitschek
 Vice President: João Goulart

Governors 
 Alagoas: Sebastião Muniz Falcão (until 15 September); Sizenando Nabuco de Melo (from 15 September)
 Amazonas: Plínio Ramos Coelho 
 Bahia: Antônio Balbino 
 Ceará: Paulo Sarasate 
 Espírito Santo: Francisco Lacerda de Aguiar
 Goiás: José Ludovico de Almeida 
 Maranhão: 
 Mato Grosso: João Ponce de Arruda
 Minas Gerais: José Francisco Bias Fortes 
 Pará: Magalhães Barata 
 Paraíba: Flávio Coutinho 
 Paraná: Moisés Lupion
 Pernambuco: Osvaldo Cordeiro de Farias 
 Piauí: Jacob Gaioso e Almendra 
 Rio de Janeiro: Miguel Couto Filho                                                      
 Rio Grande do Norte: Dinarte de Medeiros Mariz 
 Rio Grande do Sul: Ildo Meneghetti 
 Santa Catarina: Jorge Lacerda 
 São Paulo: Jânio Quadros 
 Sergipe: Leandro Maciel

Vice governors
 Alagoas: Sizenando Nabuco de Melo 
 Ceará: Wilson Gonçalves 
 Espírito Santo: Adwalter Ribeiro Soares
 Goiás: Bernardo Sayão Carvalho Araújo 
 Maranhão: Alexandre Alves Costa (from 9 July)
 Mato Grosso: Henrique José Vieira Neto 
 Minas Gerais: Artur Bernardes Filho 
 Paraíba: Pedro Gondim 
 Pernambuco: Otávio Correia de Araújo (from 23 May)
 Piauí: Francisco Ferreira de Castro 
 Rio de Janeiro: Roberto Silveira
 Rio Grande do Norte: José Augusto Varela 
 Santa Catarina: Heriberto Hülse 
 São Paulo: Porfírio da Paz 
 Sergipe: José Machado de Souza

Events 
January 26 – The Ibirapuera Planetarium in São Paulo opens to the public. It is the first planetarium in the Southern Hemisphere.
October 16 – Farmer Antônio Vilas Boas claims to have been abducted by extraterrestrials; it is one of the earliest recorded alien abduction cases.

Births
June 6 – Fábio Barreto, filmmaker, actor, screenwriter, and film producer (d. 2019)
June 7 – Otávio Frias Filho, journalist (d. 2018) 
June 12 – Ciro Pessoa, musician (Titãs, Cabine C), journalist, screenwriter and poet

Deaths 
January 26 – José Linhares, 15th President of Brazil (b. 1886)

References

See also 
1957 in Brazilian football
1957 in Brazilian television

 
1950s in Brazil
Years of the 20th century in Brazil
Brazil
Brazil